Running on Karma, also known as An Intelligent Muscle Man, is a 2003 Hong Kong action thriller film produced and directed by Johnnie To and Wai Ka-fai.  The film is ultimately a Buddhist parable about the nature of karma. There were some cuts in the Mainland China edition to meet the requirements for release there.

This is the second film starring Andy Lau in which he wears a prosthetic suit. In his previous film, Love on a Diet, he wore a fat suit, while in this film, he wears a muscle suit. Principal photography began from March to July 2003, though filming was interrupted in April due to the SARS pandemic.

Running on Karma was a critical and commercial success, grossing HK$26,339,848 at the Hong Kong box office, making it the third-highest grossing film of the year in the territory, and received 13 nominations at the 23rd Hong Kong Film Awards, winning Best Film, Best Screenplay and Best Actor for Lau, who wins the award for the second time after being awarded for his performance in Running Out of Time in 2000. In addition, Lau's performance in the film also won him the Hong Kong Film Critics Society Award for Best Actor and the Chinese Film Media Awards for Best Actor of the Hong Kong/Taiwan region.

Plot 

Big (Andy Lau) was a Buddhist Monk, but he gave up this occupation when he realized he could see a person's past life, which would mean he would be able to predict what would happen to that person because of Karma. Big then became a bodybuilder and worked in a strip bar when he ran into Lee Fung-yee (Cecilia Cheung). Lee was working as an undercover cop in the CID which busted Big in his strip show, but Big became entangled in another police case to catch a murderer when he tried to escape.

While Big was running away from Lee's pursuit, he saw a police dog and has visions of the dog's previous life. The dog was previously a child who beat up dogs, and the dog was shot by a stray bullet meant for the criminal. This was the first time that Big showed his ability to see the past, and later saw the past life of Lee, a Japanese soldier killing civilians.

Big (after realizing that Lee was kind-hearted), decided to help her in the investigation of a homicide, but also swore to leave her after they solved the case. After Big had inspected the corpse, he saw the deceased's previous life. The deceased had betrayed the murderer in his previous life and hence killed by him in this life. Big also saw that in the previous life of the murderer, before the murderer died, he cut off a one-horn beetle's left arm and hence deduced that in the current life, there would be someone without a left arm who would help to find the present murderer. Big successfully helped the police to arrest the murderer and saved Lee's life in the process as well. Her karma gets broken as well but subsequently returned, as seen through Big's vision. He also stopped an angry police sergeant who was beating the murderer by saying to him, "One thought Heaven, One thought Hell".

Lee, now realizing that she was, in her previous life, a Japanese soldier, made efforts to compensate for the atrocities she committed in her previous life. Deciding to repay Big before she dies, Lee decided to find Big's childhood friend's killer, and she thinks the killer is hiding in the mountains somewhere. She went to the mountains and on the sixth day of her journey, she encounters the killer at a part of the mountains where Big never went to find his friend's killer. The killer runs away from her while she tries to help him. Then, the killer comes behind her, and drags her to a rocky place where she was hit by a rock in the head, and beheaded by the murderer. The whole incident was recorded by her video camera. The video camera was retrieved after a search party to look for her. Big saw the video after a police officer showed it to him and he gets angry and goes to the mountains. When he was on the mountains, he heard Lee's watch. He followed the sound to her buried body in the ground and her head in a tree. He became enraged and pursued a man, presuming he is Lee's killer into an underground temple. Big, expecting to find the killer in the temple but found his future self, a killer, bloodthirsty and vengeful. They argued and fought and came to terms peacefully in meditation.

Big becomes a monk again and lives on the mountain. After five years, he meets his childhood friend's killer again, and in forgiveness, escorts him kindly to the police. In the end, at the "place where Big couldn't jump over," we see the positive karma that Lee cultivated and radiated ultimately saved Big.

Hilary Hongjin He, a doctoral student at the University of Western Sydney, wrote that the version of the film released in Mainland China stated that the editing, required by Mainland authorities, was "substantial" to the point where it "fundamentally degraded the philosophical, thought-provoking movie to a senseless commercial film selling stars and special effects make-up".

Cast
 Andy Lau as Big
 Cecilia Cheung as Inspector Lee Fung-yee 
 Cheung Siu-fai as Inspector Chung 
 Karen Tong as Woman whose left arm got shot off
 Chun Wong as Lee's superior officer
 Wong Wa-wo as Lee's colleague
 Hon Kwok-choi as Slippery thief
 Yuen Bun as Chef
 Yu Wenzhong as Master Wu
 Hou Liansheng as Master Wen
 He Shengwei
 Zhang Meng as Jade
 Wong Chi-wai as Big's drinking friend
 So Wai-nam as CID
 Eddie Che as CID
 Frank Liu as CID
 Ho Chung-wai as CID
 Vincent Chik as CID
 Lam Kwok-kit as CID
 Hon Ping as Four Eyes
 Wong Chun-fai as Boxing commentator
 Tam Tin-po
 Wong Man-chun as Policeman
 Cash Lee

Awards and nominations

See also
Andy Lau filmography
Johnnie To filmography
List of films set in Hong Kong
List of Hong Kong films

References

External links
 
 
Running on Karma at LoveHKFilm.com
 

2003 films
2003 action films
2003 martial arts films
2003 action thriller films
Hong Kong action thriller films
Hong Kong martial arts films
Kung fu films
Wushu films
Best Film HKFA
2000s Cantonese-language films
China Star Entertainment Group films
Milkyway Image films
Films directed by Johnnie To
Films directed by Wai Ka-Fai
Films about reincarnation
Films about Buddhism
Films set in Hong Kong
Films shot in Hong Kong
Films with screenplays by Yau Nai-hoi
Films with screenplays by Wai Ka-fai
Mount Wutai
2000s Hong Kong films